General Cornelis "Cor" de Jager (1925–2001) was an officer of the Royal Netherlands Army, Chief of the Defence Staff from 1980 to 1983 and Chairman of the NATO Military Committee from 1983 to 1986.

Selected publications
"NATO's Strategy", NATO Review, 34/5 (October 1986).

References

External links 
 

1925 births
2001 deaths
NATO military personnel
Royal Netherlands Army generals
Royal Netherlands Army officers
Commanders of the Royal Netherlands Army
Chiefs of the Defence Staff (Netherlands)